Chinnakuyili is a small village situated in Coimbatore district in the state of Tamil Nadu, India. It has a population of 604 men and 574 women. Chinnakuyili is a minor Panchayat included in Kallappalayam major Panchayat, with large source of income collected from the land taxes. People in this village are engaged in agriculture business and cultivation of maize, vegetables, cotton and coconuts. Most of the people are farmers mostly having cows and engaging in doing milk business. Milk farming is a hobby for all agriculture people for centuries in this village. Chinnakuyili is also known for its pleasant climate, nice people, peaceful atmosphere and nice wind flow.

Demographics 
Most of the population are in lower, middle class people earning their living on daily / monthly wages by working in nearby agricultural fields, textile / spinning mills, engineering workshops and small industries.

Every year in the months of May and June, the whole village celebrates Lord Mariamman festival for a week.

Places to visit 
The entrance of Chinnakuyili village is home to a Lord Ganesha temple that is believed to be over 200 years old. The nearby Chinnakuyili main bus stand is conveniently located for visitors. On the western side of the village, along Periyakuyili road, stands the Mariamman Temple, an older temple with a three-storied tower built in the South Indian temple architecture style. The temple is looked after and maintained by the people of Chinnakuyili.

Resources 
Water resources are limited and is highly dependent on an annual monsoon.  The village has a spinning mill and many broiler farms. Many farmers have broiler farms as well as their usual agriculture activities. Wind velocity will be high throughout the year. Hence many private companies have installed their windmills here. Approximately 40–50 windmills are installed so far.

Entertainment 
In Chinnakuyili village, the youth spend their free time playing traditional Indian games and participating in community service. With a strong Hindu tradition, many of the young people attend religious gatherings every Sunday morning at 7:00 AM IST in the Mariamman Temple premises, where they engage in activities such as yoga, surya namaskar, physical exercises, and fun games. The Rashtriya Swayam Sevak Sangh volunteers are also involved in these gatherings and receive enthusiastic support from the community.

Transport 
Coimbatore is nearby city and it is well connected by air, train and buses from all major part of Tamil Nadu and in India. Chinnakuyili can be easily reachable from Coimbatore city by local town buses from Coimbatore town bus stand (Gandhipuram). Town bus route No. 108, 108A and 69B operates from Coimbatore (Gandhipuram) by Tamil Nadu State transport corporation. Buses are available frequently.

References

External links 
Chinnakuyili in Facebook
Chinnkuyili in Google Maps
Chinnakuyili village home page
Chinnakuyili village population data from Census of India as of 2001
Download Tamil fonts to view above online voters list in Tamil
Tamilnadu Water Supply And Drainage Board water supply scheme for Chinnakuyili

Villages in Coimbatore district